Mario Gigena (born March 5, 1977) is an Italian former professional basketball player.

External links
Lega Basket Serie A profile 

1977 births
Living people
Italian men's basketball players
Mediterranean Games bronze medalists for Italy
Competitors at the 2001 Mediterranean Games
Mediterranean Games medalists in basketball
Small forwards